Ipiranga is a future monorail station of São Paulo Metro. It will belong to Line 15-Silver, which is currently in expansion and should begin in this station, connecting with Line 2-Green in Vila Prudente. Located in the district of Ipiranga in São Paulo, it will connect with homonymous station of Line 10-Turquoise. The State Government plans to begin its construction in mid-2020.

References

São Paulo Metro stations
Proposed railway stations in Brazil